Jacobus Latomus (or Jacques Masson) ( – 29 May 1544) was a Catholic Flemish theologian, a distinguished member of the Faculty of Theology at the University of Leuven. Latomus was a theological adviser to the Inquisition, and his exchange with William Tyndale is particularly noted. The general focus of his academic work centered on opposing Martin Luther and the Protestant Reformation, supporting the papacy and the hierarchy of the Catholic Church.
Etymology: Latinized Latomus = Masson from Greek lā-tómos 'stone-cutter, quarryman', thus 'mason'.

Academic career
Latomus completed his studies in Paris at the Collège de Montaigu, where he obtained a doctorate in theology in 1519. In the same year, he began teaching theology in Leuven, becoming a full professor in 1535. Having risen to the post of dean of the Faculty of Theology, he became rector of the University of Leuven in 1537.

His first work was published in 1519, a criticism of Biblical language studies at the Collegium Trilingue in Leuven, as well as work against Desiderius Erasmus, which initiated a long-standing literary dispute between Erasmus and Latomus. Other writings included criticism of Martin Luther, a defense of the theologians of Leuven, and arguments against Johannes Oecolampadius and Philipp Melanchthon.

Deportment
Nicholas Crane has described Latomus as a "tiny, chilling, man with thin lips, dark, bagged eyes and a limp". Erasmus referred facetiously to his opponent's limp, assigning him the epithet "Hephestion", a reference to the crippled metal-smith of Greek mythology.

Latomus was a canon of St. Peter's Church, Leuven and was a prominent voice against Erasmus for twenty years. He was also an experienced inquisitor; indeed, he has been labeled "the greatest heresy-hunter in Europe" among his contemporaries. Despite his fearsome academic reputation, his responses to William Tyndale were both precise and courteous.

Refutations of Tyndale
While in prison for charges relating to his translation of the Bible into English, William Tyndale was questioned by Latomus, whose task was to determine that Tyndale's views were heretical and that he would not abandon them. It is possible that Tyndale's charge of heresy was determined long before the exchange, and that the sole goal of Latomus's examination was to bring Tyndale back to orthodoxy before he was burned at the stake.

Tyndale set out his views in writing, and Latomus answered them; Tyndale in turn produced a book in two parts as a reply, a work which is now lost. At Tyndale's request, Latomus countered the two parts of this book in two different writings. Latomus's replies, along with his first letter, were collected by his nephew into a work called Refutations against Tyndale (1550), which included an introduction by Livinus Crucius, the parish priest of the Flemish village of Boeschepe. Latomus allegedly intended these works to edify, not as a solely personal academic exchange.

Latomus's works are important, as they have allowed a credible reconstruction of the Catholic response to Tyndale's views; it is also apparent that Latomus either did not know of Tyndale's translation of the Bible or did not think it worth mentioning—evincing that the precise charge brought against Tyndale at the time was not translating the Bible, but the so-called heresy of Lutheranism.

Bibliography
De trium linguarum et studii theologici ratione dialogus (Antwerp, 1519)
A criticism of the Collegium Trilingue, founded in Louvain by Hieronymus van Busleyden, inspired by Erasmus.
Articulorum doctrinae fratris M. Lutheri per theologos Lovanienses damnatorum ratio ex sacris literis et veteribus tractatoribus (Antwerp, 1521)
A defense of the theologians of Louvain against Melanchthon and the Lutherans.
De primatus pontificis adversus Lutherum (1525)
A response to Luther's reply to Articulorum doctrinae fratris M. Lutheri...
De confessione secreta (Antwerp, 1525)
An attack on Johannes Oecolampadius and Beatus Rhenanus.
Confutationum adversus Guililmum Tindalum (1542)
Refutations of William Tyndale.
Duae epistolae, una in libellum de ecclesia, Philippo Melanchthoni adscripta; altera contra orationem factiosorum in comitiis Ratisbonensibus habitam (Antwerp, 1544)
A treatise on doctrinal problems.
Opera omnia (Louvain, 1550)
His complete works.

Legacy
 The academic journal Latomus: revue d'études latines is published at Brussels. It is supplemented by a series of monographs called Collection Latomus.
 One of the four main lecture halls of the University of Luxembourg's campus in Walferdange is named "Latomus" (the others being Montessori, Piaget and Vygotsky).

References

Works cited

External links
 Jacob Latomus: His Three Books of Confutations Against William Tyndale, an English translation of the Latin by James A. Willis
 Confutationum Adversus Guililmum Tindalum Libri Tres, Book Three of the Refutations 
 

1475 births
1544 deaths
Year of birth uncertain
Academic staff of the Old University of Leuven
University of Paris alumni
Roman Catholic theologians of the Habsburg Netherlands